Alec Head (31 July 1924 – 22 June 2022) was a French horse trainer and breeder.

Biography
Head was the owner of Haras du Quesnay, located near Deauville. A descendant of the trainers who founded the English Racing Colony in Chantilly, Oise, Head's grandfather was a jockey-turned-trainer, as was his father William Head who was a very successful jockey, trainer, and owner in both flat racing and steeplechase events.

In 2018, Head was participating in interviews about his career.

Head died on 22 June 2022, at the age of 97.

Haras du Quesnay
Head undertook an extensive restoration of the facilities and in 1959 brought in the farm's first stallion. Over the years he and his wife Ghislaine developed Haras du Quesnay into one of the leading stud farms in France with horses acquired from across Europe and the United States. The farm would be home to prominent sires and broodmares.

In the 1960s, Head reportedly was training 140 horses, the majority being owned by Pierre Wertheimer or the Aga Khan IV.

References

1924 births
2022 deaths
People from Deauville
French horse trainers
French racehorse owners and breeders
Owners of Prix de l'Arc de Triomphe winners